Haripur Tehsil is a tehsil located in Haripur District, Khyber Pakhtunkhwa, Pakistan. The tehsil is administratively subdivided into 37 Union Councils.

History
The tehsil was described by the Imperial Gazetteer of India, compiled over a century ago during British rule as follows:

Haripur Tehsil of Hazāra District, Khyber-Pakhtunkhwa, lying between 33° 44′ and 34° 18′ N. and 72° 33′ and 73° 14′ E., with an area of 657 square miles. It is bounded on the north-west by the Indus. The tahsil consists of a sloping plain, from 1,500 to 3,000 feet high, through which the Siran and Harroh flow. Low hills are dotted here and there over the plain. The population in 1901 was 151,638, compared with 142,856 in 1891. It contains the town of HARIPUR (population, 5,578), the headquarters; and 311 villages. The land revenue and cesses in 1903-4 amounted to Rs. 1,72,000".

References

Haripur District
Tehsils of Khyber Pakhtunkhwa